Cristina Gaioni (born as Maria Cristina Gaioni; 4 November 1940) is an Italian actress, sometimes credited as Cristina Gajoni and Cristina Gaioni Visentin.

Born in Milan, Gaioni studied acting at the drama school of Piccolo Teatro under  Giorgio Strehler.  In 1960 she won a Nastro d'Argento for Best supporting Actress for her performance in Renato Castellani's Nella città l'inferno.

Selected filmography 

 The Facts of Murder (1959)
You're on Your Own (1959)
Nella città l'inferno (1959)
Letto a tre piazze (1960)
The Assassin (1961)
Ursus (1961)
 Black City (1961)
Love at Twenty (1962)
La steppa (1962)
Kerim, Son of the Sheik (1962)
The Fury of Achilles (1962)
Slave Girls of Sheba (1963)
Il Successo (1963)
Run with the Devil (1963)
 Implacable Three (1963)
Fire Over Rome (1965)
Operation Atlantis (1965)
Night of Violence (1965)
Pulp (1972)
Andy Warhol's Frankenstein (1973)
Women in Cell Block 7 (1973)
Eye of the Cat (1975)
Willy Signori e vengo da lontano (1989)

References

External links 
 

1939 births
Actresses from Milan
Living people
Nastro d'Argento winners
Italian film actresses
20th-century Italian actresses